Kaj Olang (also Romanized as Kaj Alang) is a village in Piveh Zhan Rural District, Ahmadabad District, Mashhad County, Razavi Khorasan Province, Iran. At the 2006 census, its population was 629, in 150 families.

References 

Populated places in Mashhad County